Cobbs Hall is a historic plantation house located at Kilmarnock, Northumberland County, Virginia.  It was built in 1853, on the foundations of an earlier dwelling of the same design. It is a two-story, five-bay, double pile brick dwelling with a gable roof. The front and rear facades feature similar porches supported by Tuscan order columns.  The ends have two semi-exterior end chimneys flanking the peak of the gable.  Also on the property are the contributing Cobbs Hall graveyard containing Lee family remains, the remains of a -story brick dwelling, and a brick meat house. Cobbs Hail is one of the noted Northern Neck plantations associated with the Lee family of Virginia since the middle of the 17th century.

It was listed on the National Register of Historic Places in 2001.

References

Lee family residences
Plantation houses in Virginia
Houses on the National Register of Historic Places in Virginia
Houses completed in 1853
Houses in Northumberland County, Virginia
National Register of Historic Places in Northumberland County, Virginia